The Liga Nacional de Fútbol (formerly known as Liga Semiprofesional and Primera División de Honor) is the top division of the Equatoguinean football league system. It was founded in 1979.

Prior to independence, two separate leagues existed, one for Europeans (European League) and one for the locals (Liga Indigenas).

Since 2011, it is a semi-professional league. Since the 2012 season, the tournament is no longer divided into a league playing in Malabo and a league playing in Bata, but a single league, with clubs playing matches in seven different stadiums across the country.

Clubs

Insular
Atlético Semu
Ceiba FC
Cano Sport
Deportivo Unidad
Estrella Roja
Leones Vegetarianos
Real X Balompié
Recreativo Lampert
San Pablo de Nsork
Santa María
Sony Elá Nguema
The Panthers

Continental
15 de Agosto
AD Mongomo
Akonangui
Atlético Bata
Deportivo Anoney
Deportivo Mongomo
Deportivo Niefang
Dragón
Fundación Bata
Futuro Kings
Racing de Micomeseng
Unión Vesper

Previous winners

Performance By Club

References

External links
RSSSF competition history

Football leagues in Equatorial Guinea
Equatorial
Sports leagues established in 1979
1979 establishments in Equatorial Guinea